The Arabian World Cup is a Group 1 horse race in France open to purebred Arabian horses aged four years or older. It is run at Longchamp over a distance of 2,000 metres (about 1¼ miles), and it is scheduled to take place each year in October.

It is the world's richest and most prestigious race reserved for purebred Arabians.

History
The event was established in 2008, when it was added to Longchamp's Prix de l'Arc de Triomphe meeting on the first Sunday in October.

The prize fund for the race was initially €450,000. It was increased to €500,000 in 2011, and to €700,000 in 2012.

The Arabian World Cup is the final race of the French Arabian Breeders' Cup weekend. It is preceded by the Arabian Trophy des Poulains and the Arabian Trophy des Pouliches at Saint-Cloud, and the Arabian Trophy des Juments at Longchamp.

Records
Most successful horse (2 wins):
 General – 2009, 2010
 Al Mourtajez – 2015, 2016

Leading jockey (2 wins):
  Neil Callan – Areej (2011), Mkeefa (2012)
  Maxine Guyon - Gazwan (2017), Ebraz (2019)

Leading trainer (4 wins):
 Julian Smart – Areej (2011), Mkeefa (2012), Gazwan (2017), Ebraz (2019)

Leading owner (4 wins):
 Mohammed bin Khalifa Al Thani – ''Areej (2011), Mkeefa (2012)', Gazwan (2017), Ebraz (2019)'

Winners

See also
 List of French flat horse races

References

 France Galop:

Longchamp Racecourse
Horse races in France
Recurring sporting events established in 2008